The Legend of Heroes: Trails in the Sky SC is a 2006 role-playing video game developed by Nihon Falcom. The game is a part of the Trails series, itself a part of the larger The Legend of Heroes series, and serves as a direct sequel to The Legend of Heroes: Trails in the Sky. It first released in Japan for Windows in 2006 before releasing for the PlayStation Portable the following year. 

Trails in the Sky SC did not see an English release until 2015 due to the large amount of text necessary to translate and localize. A high-definition port to the PlayStation 3 was released in 2013, while a remaster for the PlayStation Vita was released in 2015; both were only released in Japan. A sequel, Trails in the Sky the 3rd, was released in 2007.

Gameplay
The game plays similarly to its predecessor, being a role-playing video game with turn-based battles. Several new features were added, most notably being the addition of chain crafts, attacks in which up to four members of the party may attack enemies in a simultaneous attack.

Synopsis
The game's story directly follows the events of The Legend of Heroes: Trails in the Sky, immediately picking up the story following its ending. As with the previous game, it is set in the nation of Liberl.

Plot
In the aftermath of the previous game's ending, Joshua has disappeared. After completing some training by the Bracer Guild to prepare for her new adventure, Estelle sets out to find him. Meanwhile Ouroboros, the secret organization that Weissman works for, begins a new shadowy plot in Liberl, causing trouble all over the country.

Weissmann and his colleagues eventually raise the Liber Ark, an ancient floating city that houses the Sept-Terrion of space, the Aureole. The party (which now includes Joshua among others) face Weissmann who has fused with the Aureole, but are overwhelmed by his power but Loewe, a close childhood friend of Joshua who had since joined Ouroboros and was a main antagonist throughout most of the game saves them. Weissman then reveals that Loewe and Joshua are the last survivors of Hamel, a village Weissmann manipulated to be destroyed. Loewe sacrifices himself so the heroes can defeat Weissmann. After his defeat, Weissmann is executed for his crimes by Kevin Graham, a high-ranking knight of the church, and the Aureole is retrieved by Ouroboros. After the incident, Joshua returns to live with the Brights.

Localization
In 2010, Xseed Games announced that they acquired the English localization rights to all three games in the Trails in the Sky series. However, the first game proved to be a massive undertaking, having over 1.5 million Japanese characters to be translated, and did not meet Xseed's sales goals. The unfavorable "large undertaking, low payoff" ratio, if continued, would put them out of business. Technical issues also complicated release; the game's massive size necessitated a two disc release, which in turn caused issues releasing the game on PlayStation Network for digital download, and the decline of PlayStation Portable's presence in North America made it difficult to proceed with a multiple disc physical release (a rare occurrence for the system). Xseed stated that while they were not cancelling the English release of Second Chapter, they could not keep it as a main focus and needed to work on other games to maintain financial stability.

In September 2013, Xseed reconfirmed their intentions to release the game in English in North America. With the issues concerning the digital version solved, and the company's success with releasing Ys games on Windows, Xseed intended to release digitally for Windows and PlayStation Portable, and on the PlayStation Vita via backward compatibility. Xseed received assistance with the game's translation by Carpe Fulgur who had previously localized Recettear: An Item Shop's Tale and Chantelise – A Tale of Two Sisters. The English localization was initially intended to release by mid-2014, but was later revised to release by the end of 2014. Carpe Fulgur head Andrew Dice said that progress in translating the game was slowed by struggles in his personal life. Dice handed over his work for Xseed employees to finish up, delaying the game into 2015. The script was edited by Xseed's Jessica Chavez. She noted that the English script came up to 716,401 words, which is roughly the size of 10 novels, longer than the entire The Lord of the Rings trilogy (455,125 words) and War and Peace (587,287 words).

Release
The game was released in Japan for Windows on March 9, 2006 and for PlayStation Portable on September 27, 2007. Japan later received a PlayStation 3 port on April 25, 2013. English localizations were released for Windows and PSP on October 29, 2015. A remaster, The Legend of Heroes: Trails in the Sky SC Evolution,  was released in Japan for the PlayStation Vita on December 10, 2015.

Reception

Trails in the Sky SC received "generally favorable" reviews according to review aggregator Metacritic.

RPGFan gave the imported Japanese version an 82% score, praising the gameplay, writing, and characters, but criticizing the dated presentation and cliché main plot compared to Crisis Core, Final Fantasy Tactics, and Xenosaga, concluding: "Those willing to see beyond the somewhat outdated presentation and cliché main storyline will find a slightly old school, yet incredibly charming RPG with solid mechanics, likeable characters and a well written story". RPGFan later gave the English version an 88% score, praising the gameplay, story, writing, characters, and soundtrack. They stated that it is "robustly realized and populated by an endless stream of compelling characters, Trails in the Sky approaches the pinnacle of traditional JRPG design".

Gamer.nl stated that the "story is epic, the localisation makes characters into persons and everything combined makes this game a must have for JRPG lovers and gamers that appreciate a good story". RPGamer said that "Falcom's writers do a superb job of giving the many characters distinct personalities" and appreciated "the full scope of this series, which takes time to develop pieces of its world in detail", concluding that the "two Trails in the Sky games show how rewarding the series can be". PlayStation Universe said it is a "superb second chapter with a fantastic storyline, great characters and compelling combat system".

Notes

References

External links
 

2006 video games
Japanese role-playing video games
Nihon Falcom games
PlayStation 3 games
PlayStation Portable games
PlayStation Vita games
Role-playing video games
Single-player video games
The Legend of Heroes
Trails (series)
Video game sequels
Video games developed in Japan
Video games featuring female protagonists
Windows games
Xseed Games games